Regiunea Dolj (Dolj Region) was one of the newly established (in 1950) administrative divisions of the People's Republic of Romania, copied after the Soviet style of territorial organisation.

History
The capital of the region was Craiova, and its territory comprised what is today  Dolj County. In 1952 it merged with Gorj Region to form the Craiova Region.

Neighbours
Dolj Region had as neighbours:
East: Teleorman Region and Argeș Region.
South: People's Republic of Bulgaria.
West: People's Republic of Bulgaria and Socialist Federal Republic of Yugoslavia
North: Gorj Region and Vâlcea Region.

Raions
Dolj Region comprised the following raions:
Craiova, Cujmir, Plenița, Calfat, Băilești, Segarcea, Gura Jiului, Corabia, Caracal, Balș.

Regions of the People's Republic of Romania